Carr Mill railway station was on the Lancashire Union Railway in the Carr Mill area of St Helens, England. It opened on 1 January 1896 and closed on 1 January 1917.
Proposals to construct a new station to serve the expanding population have been suggested by Merseytravel but funding has yet to arrive. A new proposal to open a station was raised by Metro Mayor of the Liverpool City Region Steve Rotheram as part of his re-election plans in January 2020.

References

Sources

External links
 The station's history Disused Stations UK
 The station on old O.S. maps, with modern overlays National Library of Scotland
 The station and line on multiple maps Rail Map Online
 The station on an old O.S. Map npe Maps
 The station and line SBH3, with mileages Railway Codes

Disused railway stations in St Helens, Merseyside
Former London and North Western Railway stations
Railway stations in Great Britain opened in 1896
Railway stations in Great Britain closed in 1917